Grynex is a genus of longhorn beetles of the subfamily Lamiinae, containing the following species:

 Grynex lineatus Pascoe, 1888
 Grynex martini (Allard, 1894)
 Grynex spinosus Breuning, 1939

References

Homonoeini